Sarnitsa Municipality (Bulgarian: Община Сърница) is one of the municipalities located in Pazardzhik Province. Its administrative centre is Sarnitsa. The municipality was established on 1 January 2015.

Geography 
The municipality is located in the southern portion of the province. The total area is 198.59 km2 (76.68 sq mi). It occupies an elongated area that is 34 km long from northwest to southeast and 6 to 8 km in width. It borders Velingrad Municipality in the north and Batak Municipality in the east. The Dospat Municipality of Smolyan Province is to the south-east, while Garmen and Satovcha municipalities of Blagoevgrad Province adjoin the region in the south-west.

Communities 
There are only three communities with a permanent population: Sarnitsa, Pobit Kamak and Medeni Polyani, with only Sarnitsa being a town.

The population is around 4,617. The majority of the people in the municipality are Bulgarian-speaking Muslims.

References 

 Municipalities in Pazardzhik Province